Lella A. Dillard ( Jackson; November 10, 1863 – January 26, 1935) was an American temperance leader. She served as president of the Georgia State Woman's Christian Temperance Union (W.C.T.U.), and afterwards as National Director of the W.C.T.U.'s Peace Department.

Early life and education
Eleanor (nickname, "Lella") Augusta Jackson was born near Greenville, Georgia, November 10, 1863. Joseph Baldwin Jackson (1841-1895) and Margaret Julieka Eleanor (nee Park) Jackson. Dillard had one sister, Theney.

She was educated at the Southern Female College, LaGrange, Georgia (A. B. 1881). Her interest in temperance found expression in her graduation thesis, a temperance poem, for which she received the class medal.

Career
For the next five years she was a teacher in the same institution.

In 1892, while living at Conyers, Georgia, where her husband was pastor of the church, Dillard joined the W.C.T.U. Returning to LaGrange, where she had lived as a student, she was made president of the local W.C.T.U., retaining that office until 1909, when she removed with her family to Oxford, Georgia.

She served in various State offices, first as superintendent of the Literature Department, sending out thousands upon thousands of pages of literature in 1903. In 1906, it was reported that Dillard sowed Georgia down with temperance information, and at each Convention, she was so well informed on the literature which was best adapted to the State needs that her table, laden with all sorts of leaflets, books, and periodicals bearing upon the temperance reform, became the most popular rendezvous with the attendees. Dillard sowed down the dry counties with facts showing how impossible it was to enforce the law against the sale of liquor and keep a healthful public sentiment on prohibition while liquor was so accessible in wet counties. 

She next served as the superintendent of the Purity Department before being transferred to the Young People’s Branch and made college secretary the same year.

In 1909, she was made State vice-president of the Georgia W.C.T.U., and in 1916, she was chosen president, holding the position till 1924. She brought to this position the many months of experience in the work when her chief had been on a leave of absence through ill-health. In defending the W.C.T.U.'s victories of earlier years, Dillard distinguished herself as an able leader. From at least 1917, Dillard used Emory University as her address.

In 1919, while president of the Georgia W.C.T.U., Dillard was also a columnist for the Georgia Bulletin where she praised efforts being made for women's suffrage.

At the conclusion of World War I, Dillard became the National W.C.T.U.'s peace superintendent, and wrote articles on the topics of disarmament and peace. In 1925, she was listed as Georgia W.C.T.U. Recording Secretary and the National Director of the W.C.T.U.'s Peace Department.

Personal life
In 1886, she married the Rev. Miles Hill Dillard (1851-1898), of the North Georgia Conference, Methodist Episcopal Church, South. They had four children: Annie, Lella, Fielding, and Miles.

Lella Dillard died in Cochran, Georgia, January 26, 1935 and was buried in LaGrange.

Selected works
 "Consciousness of World Citizenship  Will Bring World Peace" (July 2, 1925)
 "Seek Justice, Supremacy of Law and Social Harmony in Paths of Peace, President Colidge Urges" (October 24, 1925)
 "Armistice Day Appropriate for Peace and Arbitration Programs" (November 6, 1926)

Notes

References

1863 births
1935 deaths
American temperance activists
Woman's Christian Temperance Union people
People from Greenville, Georgia
American columnists